The Titteri is a historical region in Algeria. It is located in the mountainous area of the southern Tell Atlas in the Atlas Mountains.

Geography
The Titteri was a former administrative division of the Regency of Algiers.
It is located in the area of Médéa, stretching across parts of Aïn Defla, Bouïra, Djelfa and M'Sila Province as well. Its northern zone corresponds to the southern slopes of the Blidean Atlas and its southern part reaches the western Bibans. The climate of the area is semi-arid.

The highest summit of the range is 1,485 m high Djebel Dirrah (جبل ديرة). 
Other notable peaks of the Titteri are 1,423 m high Djebel Guern el-Adhaoura (جبل قرن العذاورة),
1,416 m high Djebel Kef Lakhdar (جبل الكاف الأخضر) and 1,400 m high Kef Afoul (جبل كاف آفول).
 
The main human groups inhabiting the Titteri area were mainly the Aït Ouzera, the Aït Bou Yaagoub and the Aït Slimane, who spoke the Blidean Atlas variant of the Tamazight language. Some of the traditional activities of the region included beekeeping and cattle-rearing.

See also
List of mountains in Algeria
Blidean Atlas

References

External links

Carte des tribus du titteri - 1846 - Algérie (Old map of the Titteri)
Recette de Mekhtouma , Spécialité : Titteri, Algérie
Recette de Tchakhtchoukhet Lessyed , Spécialité : Titteri, Algérie by Samira tv

Mountains of Algeria
Geography of Médéa Province
Historical regions